Mateo De Angulo Velasco (born June 18, 1990, in Cali) is a Colombian swimmer, who specialized in long-distance freestyle events. He is a 2010 NJCAA Men's Swimmer of the Year, and nine-time NJCAA champion. He also holds Colombian records in all three long-distance freestyle events (400, 800, and 1500 m). De Angulo helped his Colombian team to take the trophy in the 800 m freestyle relay at the 2010 Central American and Caribbean Games in Mayagüez, Puerto Rico.

De Angulo qualified for the men's 400 m freestyle at the 2012 Summer Olympics in London, by establishing a Colombian record and a time faster than the FINA B-cut off time of 3:53.66 from the Indy Grand Prix in Indianapolis, Indiana. He challenged former world champion and USC Trojans swimmer Mateusz Sawrymowicz of Poland, Florida Southern Moccasins swimmer Allan Gutierrez Castro of Honduras, and Palestine's Ahmed Gebrel on the first heat. De Angulo cruised to second place by four seconds behind Sawrymowicz in 3:57.76. De Angulo failed to advance into the final, as he placed twenty-sixth overall on the first day of preliminaries.

De Angulo is a varsity swimmer for the Florida State Seminoles, and a graduate of social sciences at the Florida State University in Tallahassee, Florida.

References

External links
Player Bio – Florida State Seminoles
NBC Olympics Profile

1990 births
Living people
Colombian male freestyle swimmers
Olympic swimmers of Colombia
Swimmers at the 2012 Summer Olympics
Sportspeople from Cali
Florida State Seminoles men's swimmers
Swimmers at the 2015 Pan American Games
Swimmers at the 2011 Pan American Games
Central American and Caribbean Games gold medalists for Colombia
Central American and Caribbean Games silver medalists for Colombia
Central American and Caribbean Games bronze medalists for Colombia
Competitors at the 2010 Central American and Caribbean Games
Competitors at the 2014 Central American and Caribbean Games
South American Games silver medalists for Colombia
South American Games bronze medalists for Colombia
South American Games medalists in swimming
Competitors at the 2010 South American Games
Competitors at the 2014 South American Games
Central American and Caribbean Games medalists in swimming
Pan American Games competitors for Colombia
21st-century Colombian people